Orangeville (Canada 2016 Census 28,900) is a town in south-central Ontario, Canada, and the seat of Dufferin County.

History

The first patent of land was issued to Ezekiel Benson, a land surveyor, on August 7, 1820. That was followed by land issued to Alan Robinet in 1822. In 1863, Orangeville was named after Orange Lawrence, a businessman born in Connecticut in 1796 who owned several mills in the village. As a young man, he moved to Canada and settled in Halton County. During Mackenzie's rebellion in 1837, he was a captain in the militia. Lawrence purchased the land that became Orangeville from Robert Hughson. He settled in the area in 1844 and established a mille. The post office dates from 1851. Orange Lawrence committed suicide December 15, 1861. In 1873, the Act of Incorporation was passed and Orangeville was given town status on January 1, 1874.  The public library, located at Broadway and Mill Street, was completed in 1908. Andrew Carnegie, well-known businessman and philanthropist, provided financial assistance for its construction.

Economy
Orangeville serves as an administrative and commercial hub for Dufferin County, the northern portion of Peel Region, and the surrounding area. Orangeville's downtown core is home to a substantial number of retail stores, and there is a cluster of big-box stores in the Fairgrounds Shopping Centre. Many residents in and around Orangeville also commute to different areas of the Greater Toronto Area and Southwestern Ontario for work.

There are a number of manufacturing plants located in the town. Major commercial and industrial employers include: the Resolve Corporation, a provider of computer outsourcing services; Greening Donald, a maker of automotive airbag components; Clorox Company of Canada, Glad garbage bags; Relizon Canada, pressure-sensitive labels; Rochling Engineering Plastics, formerly Symplastics Limited, plastic sheets; and Sanoh Canada, automotive components. Orangeville is also the main banking centre for residents in the area.

Transportation

The main intersection in the heart of the town is Broadway (formerly Ontario Highway 9) and First Street. Highway 10 runs through Orangeville on its east side.

Beginning in 2005, a major roadwork project was initiated to resurface Broadway through Orangeville. The downtown section was completed in early 2006, with extensive work still to be done on the west end in late 2006. In conjunction with this project, there was another one completed in late 2006 that involved building large planters in the middle of Broadway through the downtown section between First and Third Streets (West - East). The project was controversial, as safety concerns had been raised by the Fire Department because the new concrete planters in the middle of the road have made the rights of way too narrow for fire trucks to properly set up in case of a fire in a downtown building.

Construction of the South Arterial Road, often referred to as the 'Orangeville by-pass', was completed on August 3, 2005. The road runs from east to west, connecting Highway 10 and County Road 109 (formerly Highway 9). Much of the eastern stretch runs through the Town of Caledon, but officially enters into Orangeville at the Townline Road controlled intersection.

Aecon Construction and Materials Limited was the successful bidder for the Design Build project with a price of $9.8 million. The project was completed in conjunction with Brampton-based Armbro Construction, TSH Engineers Architects Planners, Peto MacCallum Ltd. and Gartner Lee Ltd.

Orangeville Transit is the town's own public transit system, and there is a commuter GO Transit bus service to Brampton. In the early 1990s, preliminary plans were drawn up for GO Transit rail service to Orangeville. However, it never got past the drawing board.

Industries in Orangeville were served by the Orangeville Brampton Railway, which purchased  of surplus track from the Canadian Pacific Railway. The railway connected with the CPR in Streetsville, and also serviced customers in Brampton to the south. From 2004 to 2018, a tourist train was operated on weekends in summer months. The last train out of Orangeville was December 17, 2021.  

In 1906, survey work was underway for an electric railway line which would serve Orangeville, to be called the Huron and Ontario Electric Railway. The planned  line would have connected Orangeville with Goderich, Ontario. The line was proposed during a period where electric railways was popular in Ontario but many would end up in the hands of Ontario Hydro in the 1930s or fail. Like the 1902 Ontario West Shore Railway this line was never built.

Demographics

According to the 2016 Canadian Census,the median age was 38.8 years, lower than the national median age of 41.2 years. The median value of a dwelling in Orangeville was $400,320, higher than the national average at $341,556, and the median household income (after-taxes) was $73,605, higher than the national median of $61,348.

Education
Upper Grand District School Board operates secular anglophone public schools. The Dufferin-Peel Catholic District School Board operates anglophone catholic public schools. The Conseil scolaire Viamonde operates secular francophone schools serving the area. The Conseil scolaire de district catholique Centre-Sud operates catholic francophone schools serving the area.

There are currently eleven public and separate elementary schools in Orangeville: Credit Meadows, Mono Amaranth, Montgomery Village, Parkinson Centennial, Princess Elizabeth, Princess Margaret, St. Andrew's RC, St. Benedict's RC, St. Peter's RC, Island Lake Public School and Spencer Avenue Elementary. Along with these publicly funded schools, there are several private schools in the area: Headwater Hills Montessori School, Dufferin Area Christian School, Hillcrest Private School, The Maples Academy (IB World School), Orangeville Christian School.

A French elementary school named L'École élémentaire de Quatre-rivièrs (translated as "Four Rivers Elementary School") currently resides in the old Springbrook Elementary building despite the reason for closing the school being 'structural' problems. Most of these problems are said to be the result of 'improper foundation for the area' as the school was built upon a swamp. It had been used as a holding school for other schools including Island Lake, Montgomery Village, and Princess Margaret, while repairs, renovations, rebuilds and construction were completed.

There are two secondary schools within the boundaries of Orangeville: Westside Secondary School and Orangeville District Secondary School (ODSS). A catholic secondary school Robert F. Hall Catholic Secondary School, despite being within the Region of Peel, draws around 1,000 students from Orangeville and elsewhere in Dufferin County.

Humber College has offered full-time programs at the Alder Street arena since 2007.  In 2019, the college announced it would be closing the campus in June 2021.

Georgian College currently owns and operates a campus located at 22 Centennial Road, offering full- and part-time courses. It is also delivering employment programs and services out of a location on 51 Townline.

Culture

Orangeville hosts the annual Orangeville Blues and Jazz Festival, usually in June.

The Town Hall building contains the historic Orangeville Opera House on the second floor. The building was restored in 1993-1994. This facility is the home base of professional theatre company Theatre Orangeville, and hosts plays and concerts throughout the year.

Begun in 2003, Orangeville's Art Walk of Tree Sculptures features more than 50 detailed works by local artists. The sculptures are carved from old maple trees that have died from natural causes. The largest tree sculpture is a tribute to Canadiana and the centrepiece of a small newly-developed park. It is a story totem entitled Nature's Unity, and celebrates Canada's 150th birthday.

Sports
The Orangeville Flyers were a junior 'A' ice hockey team and part of the Ontario Junior Hockey League. They played home games at the Alder Street Recreation Facility until moving to Brampton in 2018. Orangeville was also home to a professional basketball team, the Orangeville A's of the National Basketball League of Canada, who played at the Orangeville Athlete Institute.  The Athlete Institute Academy is home to Orangeville Prep, which has produced two top-10 NBA draft picks.

The Orangeville Northmen junior A and B box lacrosse teams are based in Orangeville. The Orangeville Otters are a competitive swim team based in Orangeville.  The team trains at the Alder and Tony Rose pools.

Media
There are two local newspapers based in Orangeville, the Orangeville Citizen and the Orangeville Banner.

Two radio stations are licensed to Orangeville, adult contemporary CKMO-FM (FM 101 Orangeville) and rhythmic contemporary CIDC-FM (Z103.5). CKMO launched in 2015 and broadcasts from studios in downtown Orangeville. CIDC has historically targeted the broader Greater Toronto Area as a rimshot, and has usually marketed itself as a Toronto station (having moved its tower closer to the city, and operating from studios in Etobicoke) rather than operate as an Orangeville-specific outlet. It faced reprimands from the CRTC in 2016 for not regularly broadcasting news and information content of specific relevance to Orangeville.

Until June 2005, Rogers TV maintained its Peel North studio and production facility at 98 C-Line. The facility was closed to allow for expansion of the Peel North headend.

Government and politics
Orangeville is located in provincial electoral district of Dufferin—Caledon. This was changed from Dufferin—Peel—Wellington—Grey when the Province instituted the 107 electoral districts revision in 2006. Its current Member of Provincial Parliament is Sylvia Jones, former assistant to Progressive Conservative Party of Ontario leader, John Tory. Federally, Orangeville is located in the Dufferin—Caledon electoral district. Its elected Member of Parliament is currently Kyle Seeback of the Conservative Party.

Climate

Notable people

Nana Attakora, soccer player currently playing for Oakland Roots SC of the National Independent Soccer Association
Keith Beavers, Olympic swimmer (2004 and 2008)
Sarah Bonikowsky, Olympic rower (2008)
Ryan Cooley, actor who portrayed J.T. Yorke on Degrassi: The Next Generation
Adam Copeland, professional wrestler and actor, WWE Hall of Famer, better known by the ring name Edge
Dvbbs, Canadian production duo
Logan McGuinness (born Logan Cotton), professional boxer, former North American Boxing Association Featherweight Champion, NABA Super featherweight Champion, NABA Lightweight Champion
Nick Cvjetkovich, professional wrestler better known as Kizarny in WWE and Sinn in TNA
Robertson Davies, author, died in December 1995 at Orangeville
Dan Ellis, former NHL goalie
Laurie Graham, represented Canada at three Olympic games in downhill skiing and won six World Cup races
Karen Knox, actor and director
Thon Maker, alumnus of the Athlete Institute and 2016 draft pick of the Milwaukee Bucks
Jamal Murray, alumnus of the Athlete Institute and 2016 draft pick of the Denver Nuggets
Jason Reso, professional wrestler, WWE and TNA World Champion, better known by the ring name Christian Cage or simply Christian
Brett Ritchie, professional ice hockey player
Nick Ritchie,  professional ice hockey player, younger brother of Brett Ritchie

Orangeville has produced a number of notable National Lacrosse League players, including:
 Bruce Codd
 Pat Coyle, NLL Defensive Player of the Year in 2002
 Rusty Kruger
 Brodie Merrill, NLL Rookie of the Year and Defensive Player of the Year in 2006
 Brandon Miller
 the Sanderson family, including Terry, Nathan, Josh, Phil, and Chris
 Dillon Ward, NLL, MVP of 2014 World Lacrosse Championships

Notes

References

External links

 

 
Lower-tier municipalities in Ontario
Towns in Ontario